The Palo Verde Dam (officially called the Palo Verde Diversion Dam) is a diversion dam on the Colorado River in La Paz County, Arizona, and Riverside County, California, in the southwestern United States, approximately  northeast of Blythe. The dam is earthen and rockfill, built solely to divert water into irrigation canals serving the Palo Verde Irrigation District. Construction of the dam, which began in 1956 and ended in 1958, was authorized by the U.S. Bureau of Reclamation. The dam was constructed to raise the water level of the river because the upstream Hoover and Davis Dams blocked sediment, causing significant degradation of the riverbed that hampered water diversion.

The control house of the dam is found immediately upstream of the headworks area.

See also
 List of dams and reservoirs in California

References

External links
 
 

Dams in California
Dams in Arizona
Dams of the Lower Colorado River Valley
Buildings and structures in La Paz County, Arizona
Buildings and structures in Riverside County, California
Blythe, California
Dams on the Colorado River
United States Bureau of Reclamation dams
Dams completed in 1958
1958 establishments in Arizona